The Stupa No. 2 at Sanchi, also called Sanchi II, is one of the oldest existing Buddhist stupas in India, and part of the Buddhist complex of Sanchi in Madhya Pradesh. It is of particular interest since it has the earliest known important displays of decorative reliefs in India, probably anterior to the reliefs at the Mahabodhi Temple in Bodh Gaya, or the reliefs of Bharhut. It displays what has been called "the oldest extensive stupa decoration in existence". Stupa II at Sanchi is therefore considered as the birthplace of Jataka illustrations.

Foundation

Stupa No. 2 is located in the Buddhist complex of Sanchi. It was probably founded later than the Great Stupa (Stupa number 1) at Sanchi, but it contained reliquaries dated to the Mauryan Empire period (323-185 BCE), and it was the earliest to receive decorative reliefs, about a century earlier than Stupa Nb 1.

One of the key indicators to date Sanchi Stupa No.2 has been the similarity of its architectural motifs with those of Heliodorus pillar, which is datable to circa 113 BCE due to its establishment during the rule of Indo-Greek Antialcidas, as well as similarities of the paleography of the inscriptions.

The Stupa is located outside of the main complex of Sanchi, about 300 meters to the west, on the slope of Sanchi hill. It is located in a lower position than Stupa 1 because the relics it contained, are those of church dignitaries from the time of Ashoka, who were considered as worthy of a lower position than the Buddha himself in Stupa number 1, or his disciples in Stupa number 3.

Relics

The Stupa contained a relic box with four small caskets of steatite inside, containing human bones. An inscription in early Brahmi was found on the relic box, mentioning that it contained "the relics of all teachers, including Kasapagota and Vachi-Suvijayita". Besides, ten saints were mentioned on the caskets, who either participated to the Third Buddhist Council held under Ashoka, or were sent as emissaries to the Himalayas to preach the Buddhist doctrine. Among them is a "Mogaliputa", who may be Mogaliputa Tissa, who presided the Third Buddhist Council, but this is disputed.

Content of the reliefs
Typically, the earliest medallions at Sanchi are dated to 115 BC, while the more extensive pillar carvings are dated to around 80 BC, or almost a century later than the first ones, around 15 BCE.

Early period (circa 115 BCE)
These reliefs from the early period of Sanchi II (circa 115 BCE) are the earliest known examples of Indian stone reliefs.

First Jatakas

One relief of a horse-headed woman, similar to another one at the Mahabodhi Temple of Bodh Gaya, is thought to be the first known representation of a Jataka (a story of a previous life of the Buddha), the Padakusalamanava Jataka, in which a horse-headed ogress falls in love with one of her preys, and the Bodhisattva (the future Buddha) is born of their union.

These first attempts at narrative art are aniconic, as they do not represent the Buddha directly, but only his appearance in previous lives, or his symbols.

These are altogether 455 medallions and half-medallions, or which 293 consist in lotus flowers, and 126 in a lotus with another motif. Only 36 of the medallions have another subject. For the first time, clearly Buddhist themes are represented, particularly the four events in the life of the Buddha that are: the Nativity, the Enlightenment, the First Sermon and the Decease. Some authors consider these reliefs as the prelude (the "prolegomenon") of the iconography of the reliefs in Bharhut (100-80 BCE) and of the later and much more evolved depictions on the toranas of the Great Stupa in Sanchi (1st century BCE/CE).

Influence from the northwest
It is thought that the earliest reliefs from the last quarter of the 2nd century BCE were produced by craftsmen from the area of Gandhara in northwestern Indian, a central Indo-Greek region, because they left mason's marks in Kharoshthi (a script used around the area of Gandhara), as opposed to the local Brahmi script. This seems to imply that these foreign workers were responsible for some of the earliest and sometimes quite foreign motifs and figures that can be found on the railings of the stupa.

Around the time of the first reliefs at Stupa II, in 115 BCE, the embassy of Heliodorus from the Indo-Greek king of Taxila named Antialkidas, visited the court of the Sungas king Bhagabhadra in Vidisha, about 6 km away from Sanchi. In Vidisha, Heliodorus established the Heliodorus pillar in a dedication to Vāsudeva. This would indicate that relations between the Indo-Greeks and the Sungas had improved by that time, that people traveled between the two realms, and also that the Indo-Greeks readily followed Indian religions.

Floral designs
The vast majority of the oldest medallions and half-medallions (293 out of 455) simply consist in a lotus motif. And 126 additional medallions and half medallions represent a lotus with another motif. Some motifs take on Hellenistic decorative forms.

Buddhist symbols
Parmi les médaillons, les symboles purement Bouddhistes sont assez rares, bien qu'apparaissent par endroit les motifs de triratna, de palmette (visible déjà dans le Châpiteau de Pataliputra, 3ième siècle av. J.-C.), au milieu des multiples motifs de lotus.

Among the medallions, purely Buddhist symbols are quite rare, although the motifs of triratnas, palmettes (already visible in the Pataliputra capital, 3rd century BCE), appear in places, in the middle of multiple lotus motifs.

Later period (circa 15 BCE)
About a century later, some more descriptive reliefs were added, and often superimposed on the earlier ones, which clearly show the evolution of Buddhist during the intervening period. This time, the reliefs are much more Buddhist in character, and are contemporary with the reliefs on the torana gateways of the Great Stupa at Sanchi.

Dedicatory inscriptions

There are also numerous dedicatory inscriptions on the railings of Stupa II in the Brahmi script, in a style similar to the Bharhut Stupa. The similarity in paleography suggests that Sanchi Stupa No. 2 and Bharhut were roughly coeval.

References

External links

 Google Street View tour of Sanchi Stupa No.2

Tourist attractions in Raisen district
World Heritage Sites in India
Mauryan art
Indian architectural history
Stupas in India
Buddha statues in India
Buddhist sites in Madhya Pradesh
World Heritage Sites in Madhya Pradesh
Indian Buddhist sculpture